Bangla Academy Fellowship is an honor organization that recognizes notable people from the Bangla Academy. This fellowship is awarded annually in recognition of special contributions to their respective fields. So far, those who have received Bangla Academy Fellowship are:

Fellows 

 Maulana Mohammad Akram Khan
 Muhammad Shahidullah
 Golam Mostafa
 Jasimuddin
 Begum Shamsun Nahar Mahmood
 Zainul Abedin
 Khan Bahadur Ahsanullah
 Sheikh Reazuddin Ahmed
 Sheikh Habibur Rahman
 Nurunnesa Khatun Vidyabinodini
 Mozammel Hawk
 Khoda Box
Aroj Ali Matubbar
 Mujibur Rahman biswas
Mahbub ul Alam Chowdhury
Manindra Nath Samajdar
Sheikh Lutfar Rahman
 Kamaluddin Ahmed
Safiuddin Ahmed
Kamrul Hasan Bhuiyan
Abu Sayed Chowdhury
 Abdul Ahad
Azizur Rahman Mallik
 Shah Fazlur Rahman
Abdur Razzak
 Mohammad Ibrahim
Muhammad Shams-ul Haq
Mohammad Nurul Haque
 Dewan Mohammad Azaroff
Abdul Haque Faridi
Mohammad Nasiruddin
Firoza Begum
Kalim Sharafi
Khan Sarwar Murshid
Ghaziul Haque
A. F. Salahuddin Ahmed
Barin Majumdar
Lutfar Rahman Sarkar
Abdul Latif
Nurjahan Begum
Waheedul Haq (2000)
Rehman Sobhan (2000)
Qayyum Chowdhury (2001)
Mohammad Saidur Rahman (2001)
Abdul Halim Bayati ( 2001)
Abdul Matin (2001)
Tofail Ahmed (2001)
Begazadi Mahmuda Nasir ( 2002 )
Jamal Nazrul Islam (2002)
Mohammad Ferdous Khan (2003)
Emajuddin Ahmed ( 2003 )
Ferdousi Rahman (2003)
Nurul Islam (2004)
Iqbal Mahmood (2004)
Rahiza Khanam Jhunu ( 2004)
M Shamsher Ali (2005)
MH Khan (2005)
MQK Talukder (2005)
Suddhananda Mahath (2005)
William Radice (2005)
Kazi Azhar Ali (2006)
Kazi Abdul Fatah (2006)
 AHM Tohidul Anwar Chowdhury (2006)
Jamilur Reza Chowdhury (2006)
M Inas Ali (2007)
Abul Maqsood Aaron Aur Rashid (2007)
Muzaffar Ahmed (2007)
Hashem Khan (2007)
Sohrab Hossain (2007)
Nooruddin Ahmed (2007)
Quamrul Islam Siddique (2007)
 Musharraf Hossain (2008)
Sudhin Das (2008)
Ajay Roy (2008)
Sirajul Islam Chowdhury (2008)
Sohrabuddin Ahmed ( 2008)
 Nazrul Islam (2008)
Rafiqun Nobi (2008)
Amlesh Chandra Mandal (2008)
Nurul Islam Kabinobod (2009)
Amanul Haque (2009)
Imadad Hossain (2009)
Rawshan Ara Bachchu (2009)
ABM Musa (2009)
Ataus Samad (2009)
Abul Maal Abdul Muhith (2009)
M Amir-ul Islam (2009)
 Mahbubur Rahman (2009)
 Abdul Latif Mia (2009)
 Akbar Ali Khan (2009)
 Ferdousi Majumdar (2009)
 Bibi Russell (2009)
 Send Habibullah (2009)
 Abdus Samad Mandal (2009)
 Kazuo Azuma ( 2009)
 Clinton Booth Seeley (2009)
 Atiqul Haque Chowdhury (2010)
 ABM Hossain (2010)
 Kamal Lohani (2010)
 Jamil Chowdhury (2010)
 Enamul Haque (2010)
 Shahnara Hossain (2010)
 Mustafa Zaman Abbasi (2010)
 Rashid Talukder (2010)
 Ramendu Majumder (2010)
 Laila Hassan (2010)
 Farida Parveen (2010)
 Amartya Sen (23)
 Sheikh Hasina (2011)
 Abdur Rauf (2011)
 Sheikh Hafizur Rahman (2011)
 Tofazzal Hossain (2011)
 Mostafa Monowar (2011)
 Khondakar Ibrahim Khaled (2011)
 Mizanur Rahman Shelley (2011)
 Sultana Kamal (2011)
 Mahbube Alam (2011)
 Sonia Nishat Amin (2011)
 Saidur Rahman Bayati (2011)
 Nurul Islam (2011)
 Tafazzal Islam (2012)
 Mohiuddin Khan Alamgir (2012)
 Mohiuddin Ahmed (2012)
 Runa Laila (2012)
 Mohammad Saiduzzaman (2012)
 Murtaza Bashir (2012)
 Ramkani Das ( 2012)
 Pran Gopal Dutt (2012)
 Atiur Rahman (2012)
 Sabina Yasmin (2012)
 Syed Hasan Imam (2013)
 Monayem Sarkar (2013)
 Fakir Alamgir (2013)
 Atm Shamsul Huda (2013)
 Ferdousi Beloved (2013)
 Shahadat Hossain Khan (2013)
 Nasir Uddin Yusuf (2013)
 Abul Hasnat (2013)
 Partha Pratim Majumder (2014)
 Ataur Rahman (2014)
 Mohammad Zamir (2014)
 A. B. M. Khairul Haque (2014)
 Abdul Mannan Chowdhury (2014)
 Shimul Yusuf (2014)
 Fatima Tujh Zohra (2014)
 Fazle Hasan Abed (2014)
 Mohammad Farsuddin (2015)
 Anupam Sen (2015)
 Abed Khan (2015)
 Abu Mohammad Swapan Adnan (2015)
 Mahfuz Anam (2015)
 Papaya Sarovar (2015)
 Toab Khan (2016)
 Alamgir Mohammad Sirajuddin (2016)
 Abul Kalam Azad Chowdhury (2016)
 Rafiq-ul-Haq (2016)
 Rathindranath Roy (2016)
 Shaykh Siraj (2016)
 Mushtaari Shafi (2016)
 Iqbal Bahar Chowdhury (2017)
 Pratibha Matsuddi (2017)
 ABM Abdullah (2017)
 Ainun Nishat (2017)
 Noorun Prophet (2017)
 Abu Hassan Shahriar (2017)
 Dulal Talukder (2017)
 Aminul Islam Bhuiyan (2018 )
 Monirul Islam (2018)
 Manjulika Chakma (2018)
 SM Mohsin (2018)
 Samantha Lal Sen (2018)
 Roshan Ara Mustafiz (2018)
 Escaped government (2018)
 Syed Anwar Hossain (2019)
 Sheikh Mohammed Shahidullah (2019)
 Abdul Malik (2019)
 Kumudini Hajong (2019)
 Kangalini Sufiya (2019)
 Ali Zakar (2019)
 Asaduzzaman Noor (2019)
 Professor Dr Md. Zakir Hossain (2022)

References 

Honorary Fellows of Bangla Academy
Bangla Academy